m-Anisidine is an organic compound with the formula CH3OC6H4NH2. A clear light yellow or amber color liquid, commercial samples can appear brown owing to air oxidation. It is one of three isomers of the methoxy-containing aniline derivative.

References

External links 

Anilines
Hazardous air pollutants
IARC Group 2B carcinogens